Atlanta's first Union Station, also known as Union Depot (1853–1864) was the original depot of Atlanta, Georgia. It was designed by architect Edward A. Vincent. It stood in the middle of State Square, the city's main square at the time, where Wall Street now is between Pryor Street and Central Avenue. It was destroyed in General Sherman's burning of the city during the Battle of Atlanta. Atlanta's 1871 Union Station was built on the site.

References
 

Former railway stations in Georgia (U.S. state)
Railway stations in Atlanta
Railway stations in Georgia (U.S. state)
Union stations in the United States
Demolished railway stations in the United States
Demolished buildings and structures in Atlanta
Edward A. Vincent buildings
Burned buildings and structures in the United States
Railway stations in the United States opened in 1853
Railway stations closed in 1864
Buildings and structures demolished in 1864